Maruyama Station (丸山駅) is the name of three train stations in Japan:

 Maruyama Station (Hyōgo)
 Maruyama Station (Mie)
 Maruyama Station (Saitama)